The Diamond Dagger is an award given by the Crime Writers' Association of the United Kingdom to authors who have made an outstanding lifetime's contribution to the genre.

Winners
 1986 – Eric Ambler
 1987 – P. D. James
 1988 – John le Carré
 1989 – Dick Francis
 1990 – Julian Symons
 1991 – Ruth Rendell
 1992 – Leslie Charteris
 1993 – Ellis Peters
 1994 – Michael Gilbert
 1995 – Reginald Hill
 1996 – H. R. F. Keating
 1997 – Colin Dexter
 1998 – Ed McBain
 1999 – Margaret Yorke
 2000 – Peter Lovesey
 2001 – Lionel Davidson
 2002 – Sara Paretsky
 2003 – Robert Barnard
 2004 – Lawrence Block
 2005 – Ian Rankin
 2006 – Elmore Leonard
 2007 – John Harvey
 2008 – Sue Grafton
 2009 – Andrew Taylor
 2010 – Val McDermid
 2011 – Lindsey Davis
 2012 – Frederick Forsyth
2013 – Lee Child
 2014 – Simon Brett
 2015 – Catherine Aird
 2016 – Peter James
 2017 – Ann Cleeves
 2018 – Michael Connelly
 2019 – Robert Goddard
 2020 – Martin Edwards
 2021 – Martina Cole
 2022 – CJ Sansom
 2023 – Walter Mosley

References

Awards established in 1986
1986 establishments in the United Kingdom
Literary awards honoring lifetime achievement
Mystery and detective fiction awards